Hannover-Nordstadt is a railway station located in Hannover, Germany. The station is located on the Hanover–Minden railway, Bremen–Hanover railway and the Heath Railway. The train services are operated by Deutsche Bahn as part of the Hanover S-Bahn. It was designed in 1996 for the Expo line by Studio Hansjörg Göritz as the winning scheme in a design competition for the entire system of which this one remained as the network's single implementation, connecting the airport to the World Expo 2000 fairgrounds. Its design was showcased in the exhibition La Rinascimento della Stazione [The Rebirth of Train Stations] at the 1996 Venice Architecture Biennale.

Train services
The following services currently call at the station:

Hannover S-Bahn services  Minden - Haste - Wunstorf - Hanover - Weetzen - Haste
Hannover S-Bahn services  Nienburg - Wunstorf - Hanover - Weetzen - Haste
Hannover S-Bahn services  Bennemühlen - Langenhagen - Hannover - Hannover Messe/Laatzen - Hildesheim
Hannover S-Bahn services  Hannover Airport - Langenhagen - Hannover - Weetzen - Hameln - Paderborn
Hannover S-Bahn services  Hannover Airport - Langenhagen - Hannover - Hannover Messe/Laatzen

Tram services
Hanover Stadtbahn line 6 also serves the station.

6: Nordhafen - Nordstadt - City Centre - Braunschweigerplatz - Messe/Ost

External links

References

Nordstadt
Hannover S-Bahn stations